Dhakti Dahanu is a village in the Palghar district of Maharashtra, India. It is located in the Dahanu taluka, on the shore of Arabian Sea.Located just other side of the Dahanu khadi (Dahanu Creek) from the town, it is connected with Dahanu by  bridge over the creek.

The village is famous for fresh sea water fish which are available cheaply and thus people from nearby area like Tarapur, Boisar, Dahanu visits this place for fresh fish. People of Mangela and Bari community dominate the village with significant amount of Bhandari and also warli people live in large numbers in  villages nearby.

Demographics 

According to the 2011 census of India, Dhakti Dahanu has 1079 households. The effective literacy rate (i.e. the literacy rate of population excluding children aged 6 and below) is 85.24%.

References 

Villages in Dahanu taluka